Anna-Marie Suzanne Quint Ondaatje also simply known as Anna-Marie Ondaatje (born 1 September 2000) is a Canadian born female rhythmic gymnast of Sri Lankan descent. She has competed in national level competitions in Canada and has represented both Canada and then switched to compete for Sri Lanka in international gymnastics events. She became the first rhythmic gymnast to represent Sri Lanka at the Commonwealth Games after creating history for the nation at the 2018 Commonwealth Games and was also named as one of just four female gymnasts from Sri Lanka to represent at the 2018 Commonwealth Games.

Biography 
Anna-Marie Ondaatje was born on 1 September 2000 in Canada to parents of Sri Lankan origin, Alistair Ondaatje and Suzanne Ondaatje who hailed from the town of Wattala, Hendala which is situated downtown to Colombo.

She initially took the discipline of artistic gymnastics at the age of nine but her father suggested Anna-Marie to engage in rhythmic gymnastics to focus on the flexibility considering the feminine oriented discipline, a suitable option unlike the artistic gymnastics.

Career

Canada (2014–2016) 
After switching from artistic gymnastics to rhythmic gymnastics, Anna-Marie Ondaatje has competed at the provincial and national level Championships in Canada. She also took part at the 2014 Pacific Rim Gymnastics Championships representing Canada and finished fourth in a junior group event.

Sri Lanka (2017-present) 
Anna-Marie Ondaatje went onto represent Sri Lanka at the 2017 World Rhythmic Gymnastics Championships which was also her first senior level competition for the nation and became the first ever gymnast to compete for Sri Lanka at an international rhythmic gymnastics championship. She competed in the individual qualification event and finished on 75th position with 42.400 total points.

Anna-Marie fortunately made her Commonwealth Games debut at the 2018 Gold Coast Commonwealth Games representing Sri Lanka. She finished on 11th position out of 16 athletes in the women's individual all round finals .

She also qualified to represent Sri Lanka at the 2018 Asian Games as the only gymnast from Sri Lanka to have progressed to compete at the 2018 Asian Games, which also marked her maiden Asian Games event.

References

External links 

 

2000 births
Sri Lankan rhythmic gymnasts
Canadian rhythmic gymnasts
Gymnasts at the 2018 Commonwealth Games
Gymnasts at the 2018 Asian Games
Commonwealth Games competitors for Sri Lanka
Sportspeople from Markham, Ontario
Canadian people of Sri Lankan descent
Living people
Asian Games competitors for Sri Lanka